Grevillea neurophylla, commonly known as granite grevillea, is a species of flowering plant in the family Proteaceae and is endemic to south-eastern continental Australia. It is a spreading to erect shrub with linear leaves, and clusters of white to pale pink flowers with a strongly hooked style.

Description
Grevillea neurophylla is a spreading to erect shrub that typically grows to a height of  that sometimes forms root suckers.

Taxonomy
Grevillea neurophylla was first formally described in 1919 by Michel Gandoger in the Bulletin de la Société Botanique de France. The specific epithet (neurophylla) means "nerve-leaved".

In 2000, Robert Owen Makinson described two subspecies of G. neurophylla in the Flora of Australia and the names are accepted by the Australian Plant Census:

Distribution and habitat
Grevillea neurophylla grows in forest or woodland, often in gullies in rocky places near creeks and is found south from the Brindabella Valley and the Australian Capital Territory to eastern Victoria. Subspecies fluviatilis has a narrower distribution than subsp. neurophylla and usually grows at much lower altitudes, often in the flood zone of permanent rivers. In Victoria it occurs in the vicinity of the Bemm, Cann, Genoa and Wingan rivers in East Gippsland in Victoria.

Conservation status
Both subspecies of G. neurophylla are listed as "endangered" under the Victorian Government Flora and Fauna Guarantee Act 1988 and as "rare in Victoria" in the Advisory List of Rare or Threatened Plants in Victoria 2014.

References

neurophylla
Flora of New South Wales
Flora of Victoria (Australia)
Proteales of Australia
Taxa named by Michel Gandoger
Plants described in 1919